Ertang may refer to:

 Ertang Township, Guangxi, China
 Ertang Township, Jiangxi, China
 Ertang Station, Chongqing, China